Eduard Bazardo (born September 1, 1995) is a Venezuelan professional baseball pitcher in the Baltimore Orioles organization. He has played in Major League Baseball (MLB) for the Boston Red Sox.

Career

Boston Red Sox
The Boston Red Sox signed Bazardo as an international free agent in July 2014. He played for the Dominican Summer League (DSL) Red Sox in 2015 and 2016. In 2017, he played for both the DSL Red Sox and the Gulf Coast League (GCL) Red Sox. In 2018, he split time between the Class A Short Season Lowell Spinners and the Class A Greenville Drive. In 2019, he again played at two levels, for the Class A-Advanced Salem Red Sox and the Double-A Portland Sea Dogs. Through 2019, Bazardo had compiled a record of 23–19 in 100 games (31 starts) with 10 saves, in five minor-league seasons. He had a 2.55 ERA and 342 strikeouts in 310 innings pitched.

After the 2020 minor league season was cancelled, Bazardo participated in the Fall Instructional League. On November 20, 2020, he was added to Boston's 40-man roster. Bazardo was assigned to the team's alternate training site prior to the start of the 2021 season. On April 14, 2021, he was promoted to the major leagues for the first time for a scheduled doubleheader against the Minnesota Twins. He made his MLB debut that day, pitching a scoreless inning of relief. On May 12, Bazardo was recalled for one day and pitched two scoreless innings. On July 5, he was placed on the 60-day injured list with a right lat strain. He was sent on a rehabilitation assignment with the Florida Complex League Red Sox on August 13, optioned to the Triple-A Worcester Red Sox on September 13, recalled to Boston on September 26, and optioned back to Worcester on October 3. Overall during the 2021 regular season, Bazardo made two appearances for Boston and did not allow a run in three innings pitched while striking out three batters; with Worcester, he appeared in 11 games and registered three saves while pitching to an 8.74 ERA and striking out 12 batters in  innings.

Bazardo was designated for assignment on April 7, 2022. He cleared waivers and was sent outright to Worcester. In 37 games (including 4 starts) for Worcester, he had a 2–4 record and a 3.45 ERA. On September 1, when MLB active rosters expanded from 26 to 28 players, Bazardo's contract was selected from Triple-A. In 12 games for Boston, all in relief, Bazardo registered one win and a 2.76 ERA and 11 strikeouts in  innings. On October 13, he was again designated for assignment. Four days later, he elected to become a free agent.

Baltimore Orioles
On December 19, 2022, Bazardo signed a minor league contract with the Baltimore Orioles.

Personal life
Bazardo's older brother Yorman pitched in the major leagues in 2005 and 2007–2009.

References

External links

1995 births
Living people
People from Maracay
Venezuelan expatriate baseball players in the United States
Major League Baseball pitchers
Major League Baseball players from Venezuela
Boston Red Sox players
Dominican Summer League Red Sox players
Greenville Drive players
Gulf Coast Red Sox players
Lowell Spinners players
Portland Sea Dogs players
Salem Red Sox players
Worcester Red Sox players
Florida Complex League Red Sox players
Venezuelan expatriate baseball players in the Dominican Republic